The  is a Japanese aerial lift line in Beppu, Ōita. This is the only line operated by Beppu Ropeway, a subsidiary of the Kintetsu Group. Opened in 1962, the line climbs Mount Tsurumi near the Beppu onsen hot spring resort. The mountain is most famous as one of the few hard rime sights in Kyūshū. The line operates the whole year.

Basic data
Cable length: 
Vertical interval:

See also
List of aerial lifts in Japan

External links
 

Aerial tramways in Japan
Tourist attractions in Ōita Prefecture
Transport in Ōita Prefecture
Beppu, Ōita
Lines of Kintetsu Railway
Railway lines opened in 1962
1962 establishments in Japan